See also the journalist Karel Havlíček Borovský

Karel Havlíček (October 31, 1907 in Berlin – December 25, 1988 in Kadaň) was a Czech painter.

He was born in Berlin where his parents had moved from Vienna in 1903 because his father Karel started to work in the state theatres as a scene designer. They moved to Czechoslovakia in 1923 and his father entered the Prague National Theatre as a stage setter. Karel Havlíček junior studied in Berlin and Prague Gymnasiums and influenced by his father and his friends (Cesar Klein, Pankok, Emil Pirchan, and Aravantinos) he was interested in art. However his father persuaded him to study law at Charles University and after graduation he started a career of an official.  In 1946 he moved to Kadaň and started to work in the Thun porcelain factory in Klášterec nad Ohří. Since 1955 he changed various hard manual jobs. He found fulfillment in visiting natural museums, reading his favourite Kant and Schopenhauer and especially in drawing. He drew a picture every day for tens of years. The communist regime did not allow to display his work and so he was recognized only by a few artists and writers, e.g. Karel Teige, Vratislav Effenberger or Ivo Pondělíček. Several exhibitions took place in Germany and Austria thanks to his friend Gotthard Schwinge. The municipal gallery in Kadaň is named after him.

1907 births
1988 deaths
20th-century Czech painters
Czech male painters
Artists from Berlin
German emigrants to Czechoslovakia
20th-century Czech male artists
Charles University alumni